Teréza Nováková, née Lanhausová (31 December 1853 – 13 November 1912) was a Czech feminist author, editor, and ethnographer.

Life
Teréza Nováková was born in Prague in the Austrian Empire (now the Czech Republic). She married a secondary school teacher, Josef Novák, and they had six children together. Novák got a job in Litomyšl, in eastern Bohemia, and Nováková became interested in the local folklore, influenced by the work of Karolína Světlá who she had worked with earlier in Prague. She also founded the Association of Ladies and Girls for the local middle-class women. Nováková loved the area and eventually bought a cottage there, although the death of her eldest daughter in 1895 caused her to return to Prague.

In 1903, Nováková bought a house in Proseč, where she wrote her most important works, including Drašar, Jiří Šmatlán, and Úlomky žuly. Her health began to decline in 1907. She died in Prague on 13 November 1912.

Activities
Nováková began writing articles, short stories and novels while living in Litomyšl, the early ones depicting conventional middle-class life. By 1890, when she published A Small-Town Novel, "she turned to realism in an attempt to condemn what she thought of as the insular national idealization of Czech society." Nováková published the most ethnographic of her articles in the journal, Housewife, with others going to Čeněk Zíbrt's journal, The Czech People. Her early articles did not challenge conventional attitudes about women and their role in the family, but, by the early 1890s, she had "published two important studies of women’s social status. In the first, On J. S. Mill's The Subjection of Women, Nováková expounded on Mill’s concepts of freedom and responsibility with regard to women. In the second, L. N. Tolstoy's Kreutzer Sonata from a Feminine Perspective, she reviewed the debates over double moral standards for men and women that had been generated by Tolstoy's controversial work."

References

1853 births
1912 deaths
Writers from Prague
Czech feminists
Czech women novelists
19th-century Czech novelists
Czech women's rights activists
Ethnographers
19th-century Czech women writers
Czech anthropologists